Lee Ye-ra (born 14 September 1987) is a South Korean former tennis player. Her highest singles ranking is world No. 178, achieved in September 2008. Her career-high doubles ranking is world No. 215, reached in February 2008. In her career, she won ten singles and eight doubles titles on tournaments of the ITF Circuit.

Lee reached the second round of the 2013 KDB Korea Open defeating Daria Gavrilova in the first round before falling to Anastasia Pavlyuchenkova.

Playing for South Korea in the Fed Cup, Lee has a win–loss record of 12–11.

ITF Circuit finals

Singles: 14 (10 titles, 4 runner-ups)

Doubles: 14 (8 titles, 6 runner-ups)

External links
 
 
 

1987 births
Living people
South Korean female tennis players
Tennis players at the 2006 Asian Games
Tennis players at the 2010 Asian Games
Tennis players at the 2014 Asian Games
Asian Games competitors for South Korea
Sportspeople from Gangwon Province, South Korea
21st-century South Korean women